The Star-Club was a music club in Hamburg, Germany, that opened on Friday 13 April 1962, and was initially operated by Manfred Weissleder and Horst Fascher. In the 1960s, many of the giants of rock music played at the club.  The club closed on 31 December 1969 and the building it occupied was destroyed by a fire in 1987. The address of the club was Große Freiheit 39 in the St. Pauli quarter of Hamburg. Große Freiheit is a side street of the Reeperbahn. The club had a capacity of 2,000 people, and cinema-style seating.

The club achieved worldwide renown through the performances of the Beatles, who played three residencies there between April and December 1962. An amateur tape recording of one of the performances (or parts of several performances) during their December engagement was remixed and released in 1977 as Live! at the Star-Club in Hamburg, Germany; 1962. The club remained a popular venue for British and American rock and roll acts through the mid-1960s; its success was such that it spun off a record label bearing the Star Club name that operated from 1964 to 1966, often recording acts who performed at the club.

Musicians who played at Star-Club

List of musicians who played in the Star-Club: 
 American musicians:
Ray Charles
Bo Diddley
Fats Domino
Everly Brothers
Goldie and the Gingerbreads
Bill Haley
Jimi Hendrix
Johnny and the Hurricanes
Brenda Lee
Jerry Lee Lewis (who released a highly praised live album recorded at the club in 1964)
Little Richard, who at that point had Billy Preston in his band
The Monks, with Gary Burger, Eddie Shaw, Dave Day, Roger Johnston and Larry Clark played at the Top Ten Club a number of time 1965, 1966, and 1967.
 English musicians:
The Beatles  (13 April-31 May, 1-14 November, and 18–31 December 1962.)
Cliff Bennett and the Rebel Rousers
The Big Three
Black Sabbath
Chicken Shack, featuring Christine McVie
Cream
Lee Curtis and the All-Stars
Dave Dee, Dozy, Beaky, Mick & Tich
Earth (pre-Black Sabbath)
The Graduates
Gun
The Jimi Hendrix Experience (US/UK, March 1967)
The Nice
The Jaybirds, featuring Alvin Lee, Leo Lyons and Pete Evans.
Innocent Child – Blackpool Rock Band (originally Cherry Blossom Clinic)  
Billy J. Kramer
The Dakotas
The Liverbirds
The Londoners
Maze featuring Ian Paice and Rod Evans later of Deep Purple
The Overlanders
The Pretty Things
The Remo Four
The Searchers
Kingsize Taylor and the Dominoes
Richard Thompson
Soft Machine
The Twilights
The V.I.P.'s (band)
Tony Vincent and The Giants
Jane Cane (jazz singer)
The Roadrunners – Liverpool's original R & B band of the 60s
Katch 22 – London band formed in 1966
Terry Slater and The Flintstones
The Undertakers(Band)
Ian Hunter
 German musicians: The Rattles and many more
Casey Jones & The Governors 
 Italian musicians: 
Benjamin & His Brothers – Rock 'n' Roll band featuring Mino Reitano
 Swedish musician:
Jerry Williams

Star-Club Records
In October 1962, Siegfried Loch, label manager for Philips Records, visited the Star-Club for a concert with Fats Domino. Loch persuaded Manfred Weissleder, the manager of Star-Club, to give him permission to set up recording equipment in the club. He started a record label, Star-Club Records, subsidiary of Philips Records.

References

External links

http://www.center-of-beat.com/ Information about the Star-Club
http://www.starclub-hamburg.eu/ Information about the Star-Club
http://www.merseycats.com/Maja's-Memories-of-the-Star-Club.html Reminisce to the opening of the Star-Club, with an original recording of the Beatles ("A Taste of Honey")
http://beatles.ncf.ca/starclubtapes.html Eric Krasker, The Star-Club tapes : The set that never existed.

Nightclubs in Hamburg
Buildings and structures in Hamburg-Mitte
Music venues in Germany
Former music venues in Germany
Culture in Hamburg
20th century in Hamburg
Music venues completed in 1962
1962 establishments in West Germany
1969 disestablishments